Bernardo Gonçalves Pereira Mota (born 14 July 1971 in Lisbon) is a former tennis player from Portugal, who turned professional in 1991. He represented his native country at the 1992 Summer Olympics in Barcelona, where he was defeated in the first round by Croatia's Goran Ivanišević. The right-hander reached his highest singles ATP-ranking on 31 March 1997, when he became number 194 of the world.

He was most successful in the doubles category, achieving a career-high doubles ranking of World No. 96 in 1997. The highest moment of his career was his only ATP level victory in his home country at the Oporto Open in 1996 with fellow Portuguese player and regular doubles partner Emanuel Couto.

After retiring from the circuit, Mota coached top Portuguese players including Rui Machado, Pedro Sousa and Frederico Gil.

Career finals

Doubles (1 title)

References

External links
 
 
 

1971 births
Living people
Olympic tennis players of Portugal
Portuguese male tennis players
Portuguese tennis coaches
Tennis players at the 1992 Summer Olympics
Tennis players at the 1996 Summer Olympics
Tennis players at the 2000 Summer Olympics
Sportspeople from Lisbon